The Ram languages are a small group of 3 languages spoken in Sandaun Province, Papua New Guinea. They are spoken directly to the northeast of the Yellow River languages and directly to the south of the Wapei languages, both of which are also Sepik groups. Ram is the word for 'man' in the languages that make up this group.

The languages are, 
Awtuw
Karawa–Pouye
Karawa
Pouye (Bouye)

They are classified among the Sepik languages of northern Papua New Guinea.

Awtuw is the best documented Ram language.

Pronouns
The pronouns Ross reconstructs for proto-Ram are:

{| class=wikitable
|-
| I || *wan || we two || (*na-n) || we || *na-m
|-
| thou || *yɨ-n || you two || (*yɨ-n/*a-n) || you || *yɨ-m/*a-m
|-
| he || *ra (*atə-) || rowspan=2|they two || rowspan=2|(*ra-p, *atə-) || rowspan=2|they || rowspan=2|(*ra-m, *atə-m)
|-
| she || (*ta-i) 
|}

Vocabulary comparison
The following basic vocabulary words are from Laycock (1968) and Foley (2005), as cited in the Trans-New Guinea database:

{| class="wikitable sortable"
! gloss !! Awtuw !! Karawa !! Pouye
|-
! head
| makəlak || moulaka || nouraka
|-
! ear
| maːna; nane || maklaka || maroalaka
|-
! eye
| new; nü || noulaka || nowar
|-
! nose
| witil; wutil || waklaka || wolokə
|-
! tooth
| pilak; piylake || pilaka || piyapa
|-
! tongue
| lale; laːlə || laləpi || laləmu
|-
! leg
| riiwe; riwe || lalə || lalə
|-
! louse
| nin || nipia || nipikəm
|-
! dog
| piːrən; piyren || nəpay || aukwə
|-
! pig
| yaw ||  || 
|-
! bird
| yi || awra || yio
|-
! egg
| paŋkə; wate || waːtə || warə
|-
! blood
| aipi || eipi || aywi
|-
! bone
| lake; lakər || lakə || lakə
|-
! skin
| yai || mouwil || nəpyei
|-
! breast
| muy; mwi || məy || muy
|-
! tree
| tau; taw || tau || tau
|-
! man
| rame; ramiyan || yaŋkai || lamo
|-
! woman
| taləran || telou || tʔlum
|-
! sun
| mæy; may || may || taliyə
|-
! moon
| yelmek; yilmake || yalma || yalma
|-
! water
| yiw; yüw || you || you
|-
! fire
| tapo; tapwo || tapo || tapo
|-
! stone
| til || tidi || tɨl
|-
! name
| yenyiy ||  || 
|-
! eat
| ra ||  || 
|-
! one
| naydowo ||  || 
|-
! two
| yikir || yikəramo || yikən
|}

References

 

 
Languages of Sandaun Province
Yellow–Wanibe languages